Cape Breton—East Richmond was a federal electoral district in Nova Scotia, Canada, that was represented in the House of Commons of Canada from 1968 to 1997.

This riding was created in 1966 from Cape Breton South, Inverness—Richmond and North Cape Breton and Victoria ridings. It consisted initially of parts the Counties of Cape Breton and Richmond. It was abolished in 1996 when it was redistributed into Bras d'Or and Sydney—Victoria.

Members of Parliament

This riding elected the following Members of Parliament:

Election results

See also 

 List of Canadian federal electoral districts
 Past Canadian electoral districts

External links 
 Riding history for Cape Breton—East Richmond (1966–1976) from the Library of Parliament
 Riding history for Cape Breton—East Richmond (1976–1996) from the Library of Parliament

Former federal electoral districts of Nova Scotia